Leonard Watkins (7 December 1859 - 7 February 1901) was a Welsh international rugby union half-back who played club rugby for Cardiff Rugby Football Club and international rugby for Wales. He won just a single game for Wales when he was selected for the first Welsh rugby international.

Rugby career 
Watkins was born in Abergavenny and was educated at Exeter College, Oxford. While at Exeter College, he represented the Oxford University team, and in 1879 he was awarded a sporting Blue. After leaving Oxford, Watkins returned to Wales, moving to Cardiff. He represented two clubs while in the Welsh capital, premier club Cardiff RFC and local rivals Llandaff.

In 1881, Newport Athletic secretary and sporting entrepreneur Richard Mullock, organised a fixture between the England rugby union team and a Welsh XV. At the time Wales did not have an international team, and after the challenge was accepted by the Rugby Football Union, Mullock needed to select a team quickly. Watkins was one of four players who represented Cardiff to be selected for the team, alongside B. B. Mann, Barry Girling and William David Phillips. The Welsh team that arrived to play England at Blackheath were completely unprepared for the game; there had been no trial and most of the team were unfamiliar with each other's style of play. The game was a one-sided affair, with England humiliating Wales in an 8-goal victory. Watkins never represented his country again, emigrating to Argentina later that year.

International matches played
Wales
  1881

Bibliography

References 

1859 births
1901 deaths
Alumni of Exeter College, Oxford
Cardiff RFC players
Llandaff RFC players
People educated at Sherborne School
Oxford University RFC players
Rugby union players from Abergavenny
Wales international rugby union players
Welsh rugby union players